The Boats of the "Glen Carrig" is the fourth studio album by the German funeral doom metal band Ahab. It was released on 28 August 2015 through Napalm Records. It is a concept album based on William Hope Hodgson's novel of the same name.

Track listing

Personnel 
 Daniel Droste – vocals, guitar, keyboards
 Christian Hector – guitar
 Stephan Wandernoth – bass
 Cornelius Althammer – drums
Guest musician
 Olav Iversen – vocals in "The Turn of a Friendly Card"
Production
 Sebastian Jerke

References 

2015 albums
Ahab (band) albums
Napalm Records albums
Concept albums
Music based on novels